The SS Las Choapas was an oil tanker built in 1898. She was originally commissioned by Standard Oil of New Jersey and built by the Delaware River Iron Ship Building and Engine Works of Chester, PA. As the SS Atlas she saw service in World War I before being sold in the 1920s to the Italian company Ditta G.M. Barbagelata, of Genoa.

She was seized while docked at Tampico, in Mexico on 8 December 1941 by the Mexican government and renamed, to be operated by Petróleos Mexicanos (Pemex), and homeported in Tampico.

On the afternoon of 27 June 1942, Las Choapas was hit by a single torpedo from German submarine U-129 and sank in flames east of Tecolutla, Veracruz.

Notes

Ships built by the Delaware River Iron Ship Building and Engine Works
1942 in Mexico
Military history of Mexico during World War II
Pemex
Ships of Mexico
Shipwrecks in the Gulf of Mexico
Ships sunk by German submarines in World War II
World War II shipwrecks in the Caribbean Sea
Maritime incidents in June 1942
Oil tankers
1898 ships